The 1982–83 Rudé Právo Cup was the fifth and last edition of the Rudé Právo Cup ice hockey tournament. It was played in stages from September 8, 1982, to September 8, 1983. Four teams participated in the tournament, which was won by the Soviet Union.

Tournament

Results

Final standings

References

External links
Tournament on hockeyarchives.info

1982
1982–83 in Soviet ice hockey
1982–83 in Czechoslovak ice hockey
1982–83 in Swedish ice hockey
1982–83 in Finnish ice hockey
1982
1982
1982